Stacey Bowen (born 17 December 1969) is a retired Canadian sprinter who competed primarily in the 200 metres. She represented her country at the 1993 World Championships reaching the quarterfinals.

International competitions

Personal bests

Outdoor
100 metres – 12.04 (-0.9 m/s, Tuscaloosa 1999)
200 metres – 22.85 (+1.1 m/s, Fayetteville 1994)
400 metres – 52.82 (Montreal 1996)

Indoor
200 metres – 23.47 (Indianapolis 1993)

References

External links
 
 
 

1969 births
Living people
Canadian female sprinters
World Athletics Championships athletes for Canada
Pan American Games track and field athletes for Canada
Athletes (track and field) at the 1990 Commonwealth Games
Athletes (track and field) at the 1991 Pan American Games
Athletes (track and field) at the 1994 Commonwealth Games
Commonwealth Games medallists in athletics
Commonwealth Games bronze medallists for Canada
Medallists at the 1994 Commonwealth Games